Alice: A True Story is a Malayalam psychological film scripted and directed by Anil Das. The Film is about a woman who develops a split personality - a condition called fugue. It is the first time that this subject was addressed in Indian cinema.

Cast
 Rahul Madhav as Melvin Immanuel
 Priyamani as Alice/Uma
 Prathap Pothen as Dr Sivapanchanathan
 Sreeraman as Sabapathi

References

2014 films
2010s Malayalam-language films